Wellner is a surname. Notable people with the surname include:

Jon Wellner (born 1975), American actor
Karel Wellner (1875–1926), Czech graphic artist, painter, cartoonist, illustrator, art historian, and critic
Steven M. Wellner (born 1959), American judge